Kazacharthra is an extinct order of branchiopod crustaceans that appear to be closely related to the living order Notostraca (the tadpole shrimp). Kazacharthrans lived in marshes and ponds in the Upper Triassic of Western China and Mongolia, and in Lower Jurassic Kazakhstan (where their fossils were first found, hence the name). It is presumed that the kazacharthrids lived much like their living relatives, in that they were opportunistic omnivores that fed on any available food source, from bacterial biofilms to detritus to smaller animals that could be overpowered (i.e., fairy shrimp, small or recently hatched amphibian larvae, smaller members of the same species, etc.).

The kazacharthrans are distinguished from tadpole shrimp in that they were much larger (carapace length ranging from 0.6 to 5 centimeters), had uniquely shaped, heavily sclerotized, heavily mineralized carapaces, and plate-shaped telsons  The carapace, or headshield had a distinctive pattern of tubercles, typically with a central-anteriorly located tubercle that may or may not have housed the compound eyes, and other, distinctively shaped tubercles that may represent attachment sites for mandibles.

Taxonomy
There are seven genera recognized, placed within a single family and order.
 Order Kazacharthra Novojilov 1957
 Family Ketmeniidae Novozhilov 1957 [Paratriopsidae Chernyshev 1940] 
 Genus Ketmenia Chernyshev 1940
 Ketmenia schultzi Chernyshev 1940
 Genus Almatium Novozhilov 1957
 Almatium gusevi Novozhilov 1957
 Genus Iliella Chernyshev 1940
 Iliella spinosa Chernyshev 1940
 Genus Jeanrogerium Novojilov 1960
 Jeanrogerium sornayi Novojilov 1960
 Genus Kungeja Novozhilov 1957
 Kungeja tchakabaevi Novozhilov 1957
 Genus Kysyltamia Novozhilov 1957
 Kysyltamia tchiiliensis Novozhilov 1957
 Genus Panacanthocaris Novozhilov 1957
 Panacanthocaris ketmenia Novozhilov 1957

References

Branchiopoda
Triassic crustaceans
Jurassic crustaceans